Bangor railway station is a terminal railway station which serves the town of Bangor in County Down, Northern Ireland.

History
The station was opened by the Belfast and County Down Railway on 1 May 1865 and closed to goods traffic on 24 April 1950.

Daylight saving time was introduced by the Summer Time Act 1916 and implemented on 1 October 1916 as GMT plus one hour and Dublin Mean Time plus one hour. However, Dublin Mean Time (used by the railways) had a disparity of twenty-five minutes with Greenwich Mean Time, which meant that the Bangor Railway Station Clock was to be put back only thirty-five minutes instead of one hour. An additional complication was that the clocks in Belfast and Bangor were twenty-three minutes and thirty-nine seconds behind Greenwich Mean Time (not twenty-five minutes as in Dublin), so the final adjustment was thirty-six minutes and twenty-one seconds. The change to the time displayed on the Bangor Station Clock was not welcomed by commuters.

The station buildings were erected in 1864–1865 to designs by the architect Charles Lanyon, however following World War 2, refurbishments made to the building by the Ulster Transport Authority damaged the original Lanyon-designed building, stripping it of much of its original brickwork. The company then rebuilt the building, before it was reconstructed again to a new design in 2000.

Service

Extra services operate at peak times, and the service reduces to hourly operation in the evenings.

On Sundays there is an hourly service to Belfast and onward.

References

Railway stations in County Down
Bangor, County Down
Railway stations opened in 1865
Railway stations served by NI Railways
Railway stations in Northern Ireland opened in the 19th century